Harold Marsh Harwood (29 March 1874 – 19 April 1959) was a British businessman, playwright, screenwriter and theatre manager. He was the son of the businessman and politician George Harwood and the husband of F. Tennyson Jesse who co-wrote some of Harwood's work. The Pelican was a successful play credited to the couple.  Screen writing credits include The Iron Duke and Queen Christina.

Selected works
 The Innocent Party (1938, play)

References

External links

1874 births
1959 deaths
British dramatists and playwrights
British male screenwriters
British businesspeople
British theatre directors
British male dramatists and playwrights
20th-century British screenwriters